Aoukar or Erg Aoukar is a geological depression area of south eastern Mauritania. It is located between Kiffa and Néma, south of the Tagant Plateau.

The Aoukar basin is a dry natural region of sand dunes and salt pans fringed by escarpments on its northern and eastern sides.

History
There was once vast reed-covered endorheic lake in the area, but it no longer exists. The former lake of Aoukar extended towards the area of Tichit, bordering the southern edge of the Tagant Plateau. Below the cliffs (dhars) facing the extinct lake remains of about 400 villages have been found.

From east to west, Dhar Néma, Dhar Walata, Dhar Tichitt, and Dhar Tagant form a semicircular shape around the Hodh/Aoukar Depression, which, prior to 4000 BCE, was an area with lakes of considerable size, and, after 1000 BCE, was an area that had become increasingly dried. During the emergence of the Tichitt Tradition, it was an oasis area. The Tichitt Tradition of eastern Mauritania dates from 2200 BCE to 200 BCE.

Ecology
The Aoukar is one of the few natural refuges for the addax, a critically endangered kind of antelope which lives in the region.

See also
Geography of Mauritania
List of ergs

References

External links
Mauritania - crossing the Aoukar basin

Landforms of Mauritania
Depressions (geology)
Endorheic basins of Africa
Geology of Mauritania
Sedimentary basins of Africa
Natural regions of Africa